Kent David Jensen, Sr. (born March 31, 1954 in Preston, Idaho) is an American musician. Jensen first started to record and release music while living in Burley, Idaho; where he specialized in immigration and naturalization law for over twenty-two years. He now spends half of the year in Boise, Idaho and the other half in Alajuela, Costa Rica. His music consists of Americana, folk, Latin American, rock and world rhythm styles. Kent was a founding member and producer of the short-lived band, Idumea. He sang lead vocals, played lead guitar and keyboard, and wrote the majority of the lyrics. The group recorded a live album in 2003 while on tour in Hollywood, California and a Christmas album in 2004, both of which were never released. Idumea self-released three studio albums from 2005–2008. After the indefinite hiatus of the band in 2009, Jensen pursued a solo career. He has self-released two albums on which he sings and plays classical guitar, EWI and keyboard. In 2015, Jensen started playing with a new band which he dubbed KJ and the Burly Boys. Their latest album, Guilty Pleasure, was released that same year.

Discography

Idumea
Studio albums
 Rockin' Around the Christmas Tree (2004)*
 Lies, Deception, and Innuendo (2005)
 El Peligro de la Verdad (2006)
 Little Boy Blue (2008)

Live albums
 Live from Hollywood (2003)*

Compilation albums
 A&R Unlimited: Special Edition Compilation – Volume 1 (2009)

*Album was never officially released.

Kent Jensen
Studio albums
 Dreams (2010)
 Your Familiar Face (2013)

Singles
 And It Burns (March 9, 2014)

KJ and the Burly Boys
Studio albums
 Guilty Pleasure (2015)

Past members
Idumea
Robert Barrera – percussion
Ana Boyd – keyboard, viola, violin and vocals
Jason Cook – drums
Robert Hamblin – piano
Nat Parrish – bass guitar, drums
Marci Ridley – keyboard
Jeff Ringle – drums & percussion
David Rose – bass guitar

Kent Jensen
Nat Parrish - percussion
Clayne Zollinger III - bass guitar, backing vocalist

Current members
Kent Jensen
Adam Cook – rhythm guitar, backing vocalist
Brandon Cook – drums
Kent Jensen – EWI, lead guitar, keyboard, lead vocalist
Cubby McBride – bass guitar

Additional musicians
Carson Boyd – cello
Ana Robins – violin, vocals

Awards
In April 2009, Idumea was presented with a Grindie Award from RadioIndy for their album, Little Boy Blue.

References

External links
Allmusic (Idumea)
Allmusic (Kent Jensen)
Facebook

1954 births
Living people
Musicians from Idaho
People from Preston, Idaho
People from Burley, Idaho